Yapu Qullu (Aymara yapu field, qullu mountain, "field mountain", also spelled Yapu Kkollu) is a  mountain in the Andes of Bolivia. It is located in the Oruro Department, San Pedro de Totora Province, southwest of the village of Huacanapi.

References 

Mountains of Oruro Department